The 2021 CS Lombardia Trophy Memorial Anna Grandolfi was held on September 10–12, 2021 in Bergamo, Italy. It was part of the 2021–22 ISU Challenger Series. Medals were awarded in the disciplines of men's singles, women's singles, and ice dance.

Entries 
The International Skating Union published the list of entries on August 18, 2021.

Changes to preliminary assignments

Results

Men

Women

Ice dance

References

External links 
 Lombardia Trophy at the International Skating Union
 Results

Lombardia Trophy
Lombardia Trophy
Lombardia Trophy
Lombardia Trophy